Thornton or variant, may refer to:

People
Thornton (surname), people with the surname Thornton
Justice Thornton (disambiguation), judges named "Thornton"
Thornton Wilder, American playwright

Places

Australia
Thornton, New South Wales
Thornton, Queensland, a locality in the Lockyer Valley Region
Thornton, South Australia, a former town
Thornton, Victoria

Canada 
Thornton, Ontario

New Zealand 
Thornton, Bay of Plenty, settlement in the Bay of Plenty
Thornton, Waikato, suburb of Hamilton
Thornton Bay, settlement on the Coromandel Peninsula

South Africa 
Thornton, Cape Town

United Kingdom 
Thornton, Angus, a location
Thornton, Buckinghamshire
Thornton, East Riding of Yorkshire
Thornton, Fife
Thornton, Lancashire
Thornton, Leicestershire
Thornton, Lincolnshire
Thornton, Merseyside
Thornton, Northumberland, a location
Thornton, Middlesbrough, North Yorkshire
Thornton, Pembrokeshire
Thornton, West Yorkshire
Thornton Abbey, Lincolnshire
Thornton Curtis, Lincolnshire
Thornton Heath, London
Thornton Hough, Merseyside
Thornton in Craven, North Yorkshire
Thornton in Lonsdale, North Yorkshire
Thornton-le-Beans, North Yorkshire
Thornton-le-Clay, North Yorkshire
Thornton-le-Dale, North Yorkshire (also simply Thornton Dale)
Thornton le Moor, Lincolnshire
Thornton-le-Moor, North Yorkshire
Thornton-le-Moors, Cheshire
Thornton-le-Street, North Yorkshire
Thornton Rust, North Yorkshire
Thornton Steward, North Yorkshire
Thornton Watlass, North Yorkshire
Thornton (ward), an electoral ward of the Lambeth London Borough Council

United States
Thornton Creek, a stream in Seattle, Washington, USA

Communities
Thornton, Arkansas
Thornton, California
Thornton, Colorado
Thornton, Idaho
Thornton, Illinois
Thornton, Iowa
Thornton, Kentucky
Thornton, Mississippi
Thornton, New Hampshire
Thornton, Pennsylvania
Thornton, Rhode Island
Thornton, Texas
Thornton Township, Cook County, Illinois
Thornton Township, Buffalo County, Nebraska
Thornton, Wisconsin

Companies and organizations
Thorntons Inc., a U.S. gasoline and convenience store chain
Thorntons Ltd., a UK chocolate brand
Thornton's Bookshop (aka Thornton's) a university bookshop in Oxford, England
Thornton Academy, a private 6-12 school in Saco, Maine, USA

Other uses
USS Thornton, several United States Navy ships

See also

Thorntons Gap, Hervey Range, North Queensland, Australia
Thornton Hibs F.C., a Scottish football club
Thorton (disambiguation) 
Grant Thornton (disambiguation)